Vans Valley is an unincorporated community in Floyd County, in the U.S. state of Georgia.

History
A post office called Vann's Valley was established in 1832, and remained in operation until it was discontinued in 1901. The community was named in honor of David Vann, a Cherokee leader.

References

Unincorporated communities in Floyd County, Georgia
Unincorporated communities in Georgia (U.S. state)